Neon (stylized in all caps) is an American independent film production and distribution company founded in 2017 by CEO Tom Quinn and Tim League, who also was the co-founder of the Alamo Drafthouse Cinema chain. The company is best known for distributing critically acclaimed and award-winning films such as I, Tonya (2017), Parasite (2019), Portrait of a Lady on Fire (2019), The Worst Person in the World (2021), and Spencer (2021). Parasite is Neon's highest-grossing film at the worldwide box office with more than $200 million. , Tim League was no longer involved with daily operations for the company.

History
During the 4th Annual Zurich Summit, Tom Quinn commented on Neon's intent to release titles that appeal to audiences who "skew under 45, that have no aversion to violence, no aversion to foreign language and to non-fiction." In September 2017, the company partnered with Blumhouse Productions to manage BH Tilt.

In 2019, a majority stake of Neon was sold to 30West, the media venture arm of The Friedkin Group.

In 2021, Bleecker Street partnered with Neon to launch the joint home entertainment distribution company Decal. DECAL is a standalone full-service operation that handles distribution deals on the home entertainment rights to both Neon and Bleecker Street’s curated slates of features. The first film to be distributed through DECAL is the Bleecker Street release Supernova in winter 2021.  In addition, DECAL acquired North American distribution rights to the South African horror film Gaia for a summer theatrical release, marking their first ever acquisition. 

Prior to the joint-venture, Universal Pictures Home Entertainment as well as The Criterion Collection and Well Go USA Entertainment (for Possessor where Neon and Well Go co-distribute the film) distributed Neon's titles on home media.

Accolades
, Neon has received a total of 18 Academy Award nominations. In 2018, I, Tonya received three nominations, winning Best Supporting Actress for Allison Janney. In 2019, Border was nominated for Best Makeup and Hairstyling. In 2020, Neon experienced its most successful Oscar season yet with Parasite and Honeyland accruing eight nominations in total, with the former winning four awards including Best Picture, becoming the first non-English language film to receive that honor,  and the first film distributed by Neon to be nominated and winning Best Picture. In 2022, Neon received six nominations at the 94th Academy Awards including three for Flee, two for The Worst Person in the World and a Best Actress nod for Kristen Stewart in Spencer. Neon has also acquired the distribution rights to three Palme d'Or winners at the Cannes Film Festival consecutively.

After acquiring Parasite in 2018, Neon financed and distributed the film the following year in U.S. territories. It subsequently became Neon's highest-grossing film with more than $200 million at the box office, as well as the company's highest-rated film with approval ratings from Rotten Tomatoes (99%; 474 reviews), Metacritic (96; 52 reviews), and IMDb (8.5/10; 796K votes).

Filmography

See also
 STX Entertainment
 A24
 Utopia
 Annapurna Pictures
 Blumhouse Productions
 Bleecker Street
 Drafthouse Films

References

External links
 Official website

Film distributors of the United States
Mass media companies established in 2017